Diego Martínez (born 24 November 1980) is a Paraguayan football defender.

Career
While playing for Sportivo Luqueño in 2001, Martínez was involved in an on-pitch altercation with players from San Lorenzo and received a 20-month ban from the Paraguayan Football Association. The ban was later reduced to 10 months. Despite the ban, his coach, Mario Jacquet, applauded his winning mentality.

The central defender participated in the 2008 Copa Libertadores for Sportivo Luqueño before moving to Peru to play for Alianza Lima in August 2008.

References

1980 births
Living people
Paraguayan footballers
Paraguayan expatriate footballers
Association football defenders
Sportivo Luqueño players
Club Libertad footballers
Club Olimpia footballers
Barcelona S.C. footballers
C.D. Cuenca footballers
Club Alianza Lima footballers
Expatriate footballers in Ecuador
Expatriate footballers in Peru
Expatriate footballers in Argentina